The Science Fiction Book Club original anthology series is a series of books of all-new short fiction(s), mainly at novella length, typically including six novellas per book, commissioned and published by the Science Fiction Book Club, and edited by a variety of editors. The Science Fiction Book Club will be ending the series in 2009, with Godlike Machines being the last of the anthologies.

Volumes
 One Million A.D., edited by Gardner Dozois (2005)
 Escape from Earth, edited by Gardner Dozois & Jack Dann (2005)
 Down These Dark Spaceways, edited by Mike Resnick (2005)
 Forbidden Planets, edited by Marvin Kaye (2006)
 Galactic Empires, edited by Gardner Dozois (2007)
 Alien Crimes, edited by Mike Resnick (2007)
 Godlike Machines, edited by Jonathan Strahan (2009)

References 

 
Science fiction anthology series